Amalthea  is a moon of Jupiter. It is also the fifth largest moon of Jupiter, after the four Galilean Moons. Edward Emerson Barnard discovered the moon on 9 September 1892 and named it after Amalthea of Greek mythology. It was the last natural satellite to be discovered by direct visual observation; all later moons were discovered by photographic or digital imaging.

Amalthea is in a close orbit around Jupiter and is within the outer edge of the Amalthea Gossamer Ring which is formed from dust ejected from its surface. Jupiter would appear 46.5 degrees in diameter from its surface. Amalthea is the largest of the inner satellites of Jupiter and is irregularly shaped and reddish in color. It is thought to consist of porous water ice with unknown amounts of other materials. Its surface features include large craters and ridges.

Close range images of Amalthea were taken in 1979 by the Voyager 1 and 2 spacecraft, and in more detail by the Galileo orbiter in the 1990s.

History

Discovery 

Amalthea was discovered on 9 September 1892 by Edward Emerson Barnard using the 36 inch (91 cm) refractor telescope at Lick Observatory. It was the last planetary satellite to be discovered by direct visual observation (as opposed to photographically) and was the first new satellite of Jupiter since Galileo Galilei's discovery of the Galilean satellites in 1610.

Name
Amalthea is named after the nymph Amalthea from Greek mythology, who nursed the infant Zeus (the Greek equivalent of Jupiter) with goat's milk. The name "Amalthea" was not formally adopted by the IAU until 1976, although it had been in informal use for many decades. The name was initially suggested by Camille Flammarion.

Orbit 
 
Amalthea orbits Jupiter at a distance of 181,000 km (2.54 Jupiter radii). The orbit of Amalthea has an eccentricity of 0.003 and an inclination of 0.37° relative to the equator of Jupiter. Such appreciably nonzero values of inclination and eccentricity, though still small, are unusual for an inner satellite and can be explained by the influence of the innermost Galilean satellite, Io: in the past Amalthea has passed through several mean-motion resonances with Io that have excited its inclination and eccentricity (in a mean-motion resonance the ratio of orbital periods of two bodies is a rational number like m:n).

Amalthea's orbit lies near the outer edge of the Amalthea Gossamer Ring, which is composed of the dust ejected from the satellite.

Physical characteristics 
The surface of Amalthea is very red. This color may be due to sulfur originating from Io or some other non-ice material.  Bright patches of less red tint appear on the major slopes of Amalthea, but the nature of this color is currently unknown. The surface of Amalthea is slightly brighter than surfaces of other inner satellites of Jupiter. There is also a substantial asymmetry between leading and trailing hemispheres: the leading hemisphere is 1.3 times brighter than the trailing one. The asymmetry is probably caused by the higher velocity and frequency of impacts on the leading hemisphere, which excavate a bright material—presumably ice—from the interior of the moon.

Amalthea is irregularly shaped, with the best ellipsoidal approximation being . From this, Amalthea's surface area is likely between 88,000 and 170,000 square kilometers, or somewhere near 130,000. Like all other inner moons of Jupiter it is tidally locked with the planet, the long axis pointing towards Jupiter at all times. Its surface is heavily scarred by craters, some of which are extremely large relative to the size of the moon: Pan, the largest crater, measures 100 km across and is at least 8 km deep. Another crater, Gaea, measures 80 km across and is likely twice as deep as Pan. Amalthea has several prominent bright spots, two of which are named. They are Lyctos Facula and Ida Facula, with width reaching up to 25 km. They are located on the edge of ridges.

Amalthea's irregular shape and large size led in the past to a conclusion that it is a fairly strong, rigid body, where it was argued that a body composed of ices or other weak materials would have been pulled into a more spherical shape by its own gravity. However, on 5 November 2002, the Galileo orbiter made a targeted flyby that came within 160 km of Amalthea and the deflection of its orbit was used to compute the moon's mass (its volume had been calculated previously—to within 10% or so—from a careful analysis of all extant images). Recent measurements of infrared spectra from the Subaru telescope suggest that the moon indeed contains hydrous minerals, indicating that it cannot have formed in its current position, since the hot primordial Jupiter would have melted it. It is therefore likely to have formed farther from the planet or to be a captured Solar System body. No images were taken during this flyby (Galileos cameras had been deactivated due to radiation damage in January 2002), and the resolution of other available images is generally low.

Amalthea radiates slightly more heat than it receives from the Sun, which is probably due to the influence of Jovian heat flux (<9 kelvins), sunlight reflected from the planet (<5 K), and charged particle bombardment (<2 K). This is a trait shared with Io, although for different reasons.

Named geological features  
There are four named geological features on Amalthea: two craters and two faculae (bright spots). The faculae are located on the edge of a ridge on the anti-Jupiter side of Amalthea.

Craters are named after characters in Greek mythology associated with Zeus and Amalthea, faculae after locations in associated with Zeus.

Relationship with Jupiter's rings 

Due to tidal force from Jupiter and Amalthea's low density and irregular shape, the escape velocity at its surface points closest to and furthest from Jupiter is no more than 1 m/s and dust can easily escape from it after, e.g. micrometeorite impacts; this dust forms the Amalthea Gossamer Ring.

During its flyby of Amalthea, the Galileo orbiter's star scanner detected nine flashes that appear to be small moonlets near the orbit of Amalthea. Because they were sighted only from one location, their true distances could not be measured. These moonlets may be anywhere in size from gravel to stadium-sized. Their origins are unknown, but they may be gravitationally captured into current orbit or they may be ejecta from meteor impacts on Amalthea. On the next and final orbit (just an hour before destruction), Galileo detected one more such moonlet. However, this time Amalthea was on the other side of the planet, so it is probable that the particles form a ring around the planet near Amalthea's orbit.

Views to and from Amalthea 

From Jupiter's "surface"—or rather, from just above its cloudtops—Amalthea would appear very bright, shining with a magnitude of −4.7, similar to that of Venus from Earth. At only 8 arcminutes across, its disc would be barely discernible. Amalthea's orbital period is only slightly longer than its parent planet's day (about 20% in this case), which means it would cross Jupiter's sky very slowly. The time between moonrise and moonset would be over 29 hours.

Science journalist Willy Ley suggested Amalthea as a base for observing Jupiter, because of its nearness to the planet, almost synchronous orbit, and small size making a landing easy. From the surface of Amalthea, Jupiter would look enormous: at 46 degrees across, it would appear roughly 85 times wider than the full moon from Earth. Because Amalthea is in synchronous rotation, Jupiter would not appear to move, and would not be visible from one side of Amalthea. The Sun would disappear behind Jupiter's bulk for an hour and a half each revolution, and Amalthea's short rotation period gives it just under six hours of daylight. Though Jupiter would appear 900 times brighter than the full moon, its light would be spread over an area some 8,500 times greater and it would not look as bright per surface unit.

Exploration 

During 1979, the unmanned Voyager 1 and Voyager 2 space probes obtained the first images of Amalthea to resolve its surface features. They also measured the visible and infrared spectra and surface temperature. Later, the Galileo orbiter completed the imaging of Amalthea's surface. In 2006, Amalthea's orbit was refined with measurements from New Horizons.

In fiction 

Amalthea is the setting of several works of science fiction, including stories by Arthur C. Clarke, James Blish and Arkady and Boris Strugatsky.

See also 
Galilean moons (the four biggest moons of Jupiter)

Notes

References 

Cited sources

External links 

 Amalthea Profile by NASA's Solar System Exploration
 Amalthea nomenclature from the USGS planetary nomenclature page
 Jupiter's Amalthea Surprisingly Jumbled – JPL press release (2002-12-09)
 Jupiter From Amalthea, a painting by Frank Hettick, 2002.
 Animated 3D shape model of Amalthea

 
Moons of Jupiter
Discoveries by Edward Emerson Barnard
18920909
Moons with a prograde orbit